José Dimitri Maconda (born 28 November 2001) is a Dutch-Angolan professional basketball player. He currently plays for Iraurgi SB of the LEB Oro and the Angola national team.

Early career 
Born in Rotterdam to Angolese parents, Maconda initially played football before picking up basketball at age 10. He played for the junior teams of Rotterdam-Zuid, CBV Binnenland and BAL. Maconda then played for the Orange Lions Academy under coach Marco van den Berg.

Professional career 
Maconda signed his first professional contract at age 17, with Óbila CB of the Liga EBA, the Spanish fourth level.

On 21 January 2021, he signed with Heroes Den Bosch of the Dutch Basketball League (DBL) for the remainder of the season.

On 17 June 2021, Maconda signed a one-year contract with Aris Leeuwarden. He was nominated for the BNXT League Rising Star of the Year award.

On 21 July 2022, he signed for Iraurgi SB (for sponsorship reasons named Juaristi ISB) of the LEB Oro.

National team career 
Maconda played in the Netherlands under-16 and under-18 teams and played in the European Championships for these age categories.

In August 2022, Maconda was selected for the Angola senior team. On 26 August, he made his debut when he scored 11 points in a 84–62 win over Uganda during the 2023 FIBA Basketball World Cup qualification.

References 

Dutch men's basketball players

Angolan men's basketball players

2001 births

Living people